Georges Island, or George's Island, may refer to:

Geography 
Georges Island (Massachusetts), offshore from the city of Boston, Massachusetts
Georges Island (Nova Scotia), offshore from the community of Halifax in the Halifax Regional Municipality, Nova Scotia
Tahiti, given the name 'George's Island' (or 'King George's Island') on first encounters with the British in the 1760s

Other 
 George's Island (film)
 Georges Island Lighthouse

See also 
 Georges (disambiguation)